Kenneth J. Veenstra (born April 19, 1939) is an American businessman and politician who served as a member of both chambers of the Iowa General Assembly.

Early life and education 
Born in Bussey, Iowa. Veenstra graduated from Tracy High School. He then served in the United States Army as a military police officer. He attended The American College of Financial Services in Bryn Mawr, Pennsylvania and became a certified a chartered life underwriter.

Career 
Veenstra was a resident of Orange City, Iowa and worked as an insurance agent. Veenstra served in the Iowa House of Representatives from 1995 to 1997 as a Republican. He then served in the Iowa Senate from 1999 to 2005.

Personal life 
Veenstra and his wife, Janice, have four children.

Notes

External links

Representative Kenneth Veenstra official Iowa General Assembly site

1939 births
Living people
People from Marion County, Iowa
People from Orange City, Iowa
The American College of Financial Services alumni
Businesspeople from Iowa
Republican Party Iowa state senators
Republican Party members of the Iowa House of Representatives